Telewizor is the third album by Paprika Korps.

The album contains 11 songs. The horn section in one song was recorded by the former legendary German ska band Yellow Umbrella. The title song, "Telewizor", contains exclusive samples from the first anti-American demonstration in Baghdad, recorded "live" by DubMayorYama. The CD includes two extra remixes made by Activator and Dr. Emzk, and also an extra song about the adventures of friendly John the Goose while visiting the forest.

German versions of this album were published by Moanin Records.

Track listing
 "Don't Trust" – 3:21
 "Crowd" – 3:46
 "Kłamca" – 3:12
 "Promises" – 3:22
 "Camp Babylon" – 5:35
 "Starting Line" – 4:02
 "Kto" – 2:40
 "Riddim" – 3:22
 "To Conquer and to Rule" – 3:27
 "Telewizor" – 3:49
 "Gąsior Turysta" – 6:00
 "Remote Control Promises (Dr Emzk remix)" – 3:26
 "Don't Trust in Dub (Activator Remix)" – 4:12

2003 albums
Paprika Korps albums